Steven Meiring (born 2 January 1994) is a South African rugby union player who most recently played with the . He can play as a flanker or a number eight.

Rugby career

2010–2012: Schoolboy rugby

Meiring was born in Boksburg and attended high school in nearby Pretoria. He was selected to represent the Pretoria-based  at two national youth tournaments – in 2010, he played as a flanker for them in the Under-16 Grant Khomo Week held in Upington, and two years later he represented them at the premier South African high schools competition, the Under-18 Craven Week.

2013: Western Province Under-19

Meiring moved to the Cape Town-based  for the 2013 season. The season ended in disappointing fashion for Western Province as they finished in fifth position, missing out on a semi-final spot despite being the defending champions of the competition.

2014–2015: Free State Under-21 and UFS Shimlas

For the 2014 season, Meiring joined the Bloemfontein-based , where he linked up with the Under-21 team. He didn't feature in the first five rounds of the 2014 Under-21 Provincial Championship, but, after coming on as a replacement in their next match against the s, started the remainder of their matches in the competition. The last of Meiring's nine appearances came in their semi-final match against Western Province, which his former team won 41–17 to end Free State's interest in the competition.

He made two starts and one appearance as a replacement during the round-robin phase of the competition as Shimlas finished in second place on the log with an unbeaten record.

He scored two tries in a match on three occasions – in their home match against , their away match against the same opposition and their home match against the s – and scored his seventh try of the season in a victory over the s as Free State secured second place on the log to secure a semi-final berth. His try-scoring feat put him joint-second on the overall try-scoring charts in Group A of the competition behind teammate Daniel Maartens, and joint-twelfth for overall points scorers.

2016: Griquas

Meiring was named in the wider training group of the  Super Rugby team for the 2016 Super Rugby season, but did not make any appearances. Instead, he joined Kimberley-based side  for the 2016 season. Meiring made a total of ten appearances for Griquas during the qualifying campaign – making two starts and eight appearances as a replacement – as he helped his team finish in second place to secure one of three available spots in the 2016 Currie Cup Premier Division. He made three appearances off the bench in that competition, with Griquas winning four of their eight matches to finish the season in sixth position.

References

South African rugby union players
Living people
1994 births
People from Boksburg
Rugby union flankers
Rugby union number eights
Griquas (rugby union) players
Rugby union players from Gauteng